Veran  may refer to:
 Veran (The Legend of Zelda), the antagonist in the video game The Legend of Zelda: Oracle of Ages
 Veran Matić (born 1962), the Chief Executive Officer of B92

Véran may refer to :
 Veranus of Cavaillon, a French saint
 Saint-Véran, a commune in the Hautes-Alpes department in southeastern France
 48159 Saint-Véran, a main belt asteroid
 Olivier Véran, a French politician

See also
Verano (disambiguation)